David Ferrant (born 24 March 1963) is a South African cricketer. He played in 31 first-class matches for Eastern Province from 1983/84 to 1990/91.

See also
 List of Eastern Province representative cricketers

References

External links
 

1963 births
Living people
South African cricketers
Eastern Province cricketers
Cricketers from Port Elizabeth